Mastic is a resin obtained from the mastic tree (Pistacia lentiscus). It is also known as tears of Chios, being traditionally produced on the island Chios, and, like other natural resins, is produced in "tears" or droplets.

Mastic is excreted by the resin glands of certain trees and dries into pieces of brittle, translucent resin. When chewed, the resin softens and becomes a bright white and opaque gum. The flavor is bitter at first, but after some chewing, it releases a refreshing flavor similar to pine and cedar.

History

Mastic has been harvested for at least 2,500 years since Greek antiquity. The first mention of actual mastic 'tears' was by Hippocrates. Hippocrates used mastic for the prevention of digestive problems, colds and as a breath freshener. Romans used mastic along with honey, pepper, and egg in the spiced wine conditum paradoxum. Under the Byzantine Empire, the mastic trade became the Emperor's monopoly. In the Ottoman Empire, the Sultan gathered the finest mastic crop to send to his harem.

During the Ottoman rule of Chios, mastic was worth its weight in gold. The penalty for stealing mastic was execution by order of the sultans. In the Chios Massacre of 1822, the people of the Mastichochoria region were spared by the sultan to provide mastic to him and his harem. , the Turkish name for the island of Chios, means 'gum island'. The mastic villages are fortress-like, out of sight from the sea, surrounded by high walls and with no doors at street level (meaning that the villages were entered only by ladders), in order to protect the sap from invaders.

Although the liqueur is much younger, it is still tied up with Greek history. Digestive liqueurs, similar to Mastichato (Mastika), but made with grapes, were known as Greek elixirs before the French Revolution.

The production of mastic was threatened by the Chios forest fire that destroyed some mastic groves in August 2012.

Cultivation 
Producing the mastic resin is a whole-year process for the local growers. The harvest is known as kentos and takes place from the beginning of July to the beginning of October. First, the area around the trees is cleared and sprinkled with inert calcium carbonate. Then, every 4–5 days, 5–10 incisions are made in the bark of each tree to release the resin. As these clear drops hang from the tree, and sparkle in the sunlight, they are said to resemble crystalline teardrops; for this reason, the mastic resin is known as the "tears of Chios". It takes about 15–20 days for the first resin crystals to harden and fall to the ground. The farmers then collect the pieces of dry mastic and wash them in natural spring water, and spend most of the winter cleaning and separating the tears from the sand. This cleaning process is performed by hand and is regulated by the legislative framework of the Mastic Growers' Association. In addition to mastic, mastic oil is also produced.

Mastichochoria 

 there were twenty-four mastichochoria, or mastic villages, on the island of Chios dedicated to the cultivation and production of mastic. Mastic production in Chios is protected by a European Union protected designation of origin.

The island's mastic production is controlled by a co-operative. Founded in 1938, the Chios Gum Mastic Growers Association, abbreviated CGMGA, is a secondary cooperative organisation and acts as the collective representative organ of twenty primary cooperatives founded in the twenty-four mastic villages. it has the exclusive management of natural Chios Mastiha in Greece and abroad. 
The Chios Mastic Museum offers a permanent exhibition about mastic production on the island, explaining its history and cultivation techniques as well as demonstrating its different uses today.

Turkey
Traditionally there has also been limited production of mastic on the Çeşme peninsula, on the Turkish coast eight nautical miles from Chios, with similar ecological conditions suitable for mastic production. The Turkish Foundation for Combating Soil Erosion, for Reforestation and the Protection of Natural Habitats (TEMA) has led an effort to protect the native Turkish mastic trees and to plant new ones in the Çeşme peninsula to revive viable commercial production of the product. As part of this project, which was expected to last through 2016, over 3,000 mastic tree saplings were planted between 2008 and October 2011 to over 368 acres (149 hectares) of dedicated farm land provided by the Izmir Institute of Technology.

Uses

Culinary

In the Eastern Mediterranean, mastic is commonly used in brioches, ice cream, and other desserts. In Syria, mastic is added to booza (Syrian ice cream), and in Turkey, mastic is widely used in desserts such as Turkish delight and dondurma, in puddings such as sütlaç, salep, tavuk göğsü, mamelika, and in soft drinks. Mastic syrup is added to Turkish coffee on the Aegean coast. In Greece, mastic is used in liqueurs such as Mastika (or Mastichato), in a spoon sweet known as a "submarine", in beverages, chewing gum, sweets, desserts, breads and cheese. It is also used to stabilise loukoumi and ice cream.

In the Maghreb, mastic is used mainly in cakes, sweets, and pastries and as a stabilizer in meringue and nougat. In Morocco, mastic is used in the preparation of smoked foods.

One of the earliest uses of mastic was as chewing gum. Mastic (מסטיק) is the colloquial Hebrew word for chewing gum. Mastic-flavored chewing gum is sold in Syria, Lebanon, Turkey and Greece. Jordanian chewing gum company Sharawi Bros. (علكة شعراوي اخوان) uses mastic as one of the main ingredients in their gums.

In religion 
Some scholars identify the bakha mentioned in the Bible with the mastic plant.

Ancient Jewish halachic sources indicate mastic as a treatment for bad breath: "Mastic is not chewed on shabbat. When [is it permissible to chew mastic on shabbat]? When the intention is medicinal. If it is used for bad breath, it is permissible."

Mastic is an essential ingredient of chrism, the holy oil used for anointing by the Eastern Orthodox Churches.

Medicinal

Other uses
Mastic is used in some varnishes. Mastic varnish was used to protect and preserve photographic negatives. Mastic is also used in perfumes, cosmetics, soap, body oils, and body lotion. In ancient Egypt, mastic was used in embalming.  In its hardened form, mastic can be used, like frankincense or Boswellia resin, to produce incense.

See also 
 Gum arabic
 Mastika (liqueur with mastic aroma)
 Megilp (art medium)

References

External links

 
 "Can This Ancient Greek Medicine Cure Humanity?"—Opinion piece in The New York Times

 
Chios
Greek cuisine
Greek products with protected designation of origin
Greek words and phrases
Incense
Medicinal plants
Mediterranean cuisine
Natural gums
Resins
Spices
Tree tapping